Twin Lakes is an unincorporated community in West Township, Marshall County, Indiana.

History
Twin Lakes contained a post office from 1887 until 1907. The community's proximity to two lakes caused its name to be selected.

Geography

References

Unincorporated communities in Marshall County, Indiana
Unincorporated communities in Indiana